The following are the national records in athletics in the United Arab Emirates maintained by UAE Athletics Federation.

Outdoor

Key to tables:

h = hand timing

+ = en route to a longer distance

NWI = no wind information

# = not ratified by federation or/and IAAF

Men

Women

Indoor

Men

Women

References
General
World Athletics Statistic Handbook 2022: National Outdoor Records
World Athletics Statistic Handbook 2022: National Indoor Records
Specific

External links
 UAE Athletics Federation web site

Emirati
Athletics
Records
Athletics